Edmund Rice (February 14, 1819 – July 11, 1889) was an American politician.  Rice served in the U.S. Congress in Minnesota's 4th District from March 4, 1887, to March 3, 1889.

Early life

Edmund Rice, Jr. was born in Waitsfield, Vermont on February 14, 1819, to Edmund Rice and Ellen (Durkee) Rice, ethnic English whose ancestors had been in New England since the 17th century. He moved to Kalamazoo, Michigan, in November 1838 to study law. He was appointed registrar of the court of chancery in 1841. He was admitted to the bar association in 1842 and commenced practice in Kalamazoo, Michigan. He was appointed master in chancery in 1845. Rice enlisted to serve in the Mexican–American War in 1847 and was commissioned first lieutenant of Company A, First Regiment, Michigan Volunteers. He was the younger brother of Henry Mower Rice. He married Anna Maria Acker on November 28, 1848.

Political career
In July 1849, Rice moved to St. Paul, Minnesota, and became clerk of the Minnesota Supreme Court's third circuit the same year.  He was elected as a member of the Territorial house of representatives in 1851.  Rice continued to practice law until 1856, when he was elected commissioner of Ramsey County.

The following year, he became president of the Minnesota & Pacific Railroad Co., a job he held until 1863, when he became president of the St. Paul & Pacific Railroad and of the St. Paul & Chicago Railroad. He served as SP&P president until 1872 and as SP&C president until 1877. In 1879, he became a trustee of the SP&P.

Rice served in the Minnesota State Senate (1864–66) and (1874–76), and was a member of the Minnesota House of Representatives in 1867, 1872, 1877, and 1878.  He was elected mayor of St. Paul and served from 1881 to 1883, was again elected mayor in 1885, and served until February 1887 when he resigned to take an office in the 50th United States Congress (March 4, 1887, to March 3, 1889).

Defeated in 1888, Rice retired from public and political activities. He died in White Bear Lake, Minnesota, on July 11, 1889.  His body is interred in Oakland Cemetery in Saint Paul.

Ancestry
Rice was a descendant of Edmund Rice, an early immigrant to Massachusetts Bay Colony, as follows:

 Edmund Rice, son of
 Edmund Rice (March 26, 1784 – May 27, 1829), son of
 Jedediah Rice (b. April 2, 1755), son of
 Ashur Rice (July 6, 1694 – August 20, 1773), son of
 Thomas Rice (June 30, 1654 – 1747), son of
 Thomas Rice (January 26, 1626 – 1682), son of
 Edmund Rice (1594 – May 3, 1663)

His daughter Jessi married Frank Hamilton Clark,  a president of the Lake Superior and Mississippi Railroad and a member of the Clark banking family of Philadelphia, Pennsylvania.

References

External links

1819 births
1889 deaths
American military personnel of the Mexican–American War
Mayors of places in Minnesota
Michigan state court judges
Members of the Minnesota Territorial Legislature
Democratic Party Minnesota state senators
Democratic Party members of the Minnesota House of Representatives
People from Waitsfield, Vermont
Michigan lawyers
Minnesota lawyers
Democratic Party members of the United States House of Representatives from Minnesota
19th-century American politicians
19th-century American judges
19th-century American lawyers